Manolo, a form of Manuel (name), is a male given name which may refer to:

People:
Manolo Álvarez Mera (1923–1986), Cuban-born bel canto tenor
Manolo Badrena (born 1952), Puerto Rican percussionist
Manolo Blahnik (born 1942), Spanish fashion designer of shoes known as Manolos
Manolo Caracol (1909–1973), Spanish flamenco artist
Manolo Cardona (born 1977), Colombian actor
Manolo Escobar (1932–2013), Spanish singer of "Y Viva España"
Manolo Gabbiadini (born 1991), Italian footballer
Manolo García (born 1955), Spanish singer and painter
Manuel Gaspar Haro (born 1981), Spanish footballer
Manolo (sculptor), real name Manuel Martinez Hugué (1872-1945), Catalan sculptor
Manolo Lama (born 1962), Spanish radio sportscaster
Manolo (footballer, born 1960), full name José Manuel Martínez Toral, Spanish footballer
Manolo (footballer, born 1985), real name Manuel López Escámez, Spanish footballer
Manolo Millares (born 1926), Spanish painter
Manolo Noriega, real name Manuel Noriega Ruiz (1880–1961), Mexican actor
Manolo Poulot Ramos (born 1974), Cuban judoka
Manolo Rivera Morales (1934–1996), Puerto Rican sportscaster
Manolo Saiz (born 1959), Spanish professional road bicycle team manager
Manolo (footballer, born 1965), real name Manuel Sánchez Delgado, from Spain
Manolo Sanchez (Nixon staff member), valet to Richard Nixon 
Manolo Sanchís, real name Manuel Sanchís Hontiyuelo (born 1965), Spanish footballer
Manolo Sanlúcar (born 1945), Spanish flamenco composer
Manolo el del bombo (born 1949), Spanish football fan
Maurizio Zanolla (born 1958) known as Manolo is an italian rock climber 

Places:
Manolo Fortich, a municipality in the province of Bukidnon in the Mindanao Island of the Philippines

Fictional characters:
Manolito's father, don Manolo, in the Mafalda comic strip
Manolo or Manny Ribera, from the 1983 film Scarface
Manolo Sanchez, a character in the 2014 animated film, The Book of Life

Other Uses
 Manolo (typeface), a foundry type made by Ludwig & Mayer.

See also
Manola (disambiguation), feminine form
Lolo (disambiguation), a shortened form of the name
Manalo
Menalo

Spanish masculine given names